Edwin is an unincorporated community in Henry County, Alabama, United States.

History
Edwin is most likely named after a person who lived in the area, but the origin is uncertain. A post office operated under the name Edwin from 1892 to 1906. Mount Enon Primitive Baptist Church, located in Edwin, was constituted on April 23, 1860.

References

Unincorporated communities in Henry County, Alabama
Unincorporated communities in Alabama